Amanda Lee Meredith (born 1972) is an American lawyer who serves as a judge of the United States Court of Appeals for Veterans Claims. Prior to becoming a judge, she served as the deputy staff director and general counsel of the United States Senate Committee on Veterans' Affairs.

Biography 

Meredith received her Bachelor of Science from the University at Buffalo, summa cum laude, and her Juris Doctor from the University at Buffalo, magna cum laude, where she was a member of the Buffalo Law Review.

After graduating from law school, Meredith served as director of the Task Force for Backlog Reduction for the United States Court of Appeals for Veterans Claims and as a law clerk and executive attorney to Chief Judge Ken Kramer of the same court.

Meredith served as general counsel to the United States Senate Committee on Veterans' Affairs and as benefits counsel to Ranking Member Richard Burr of North Carolina and Ranking Member Larry Craig of Idaho.

Court of Appeals for Veterans Claims 

On June 7, 2017, President Trump nominated Meredith to serve as a Judge of the United States Court of Appeals for Veterans Claims. A hearing on her nomination before the Senate Veterans' Affairs Committee was held on July 19, 2017. On July 20, 2017, the committee voted to report her nomination favorably. Her nomination was confirmed by the Senate with a voice vote on August 3, 2017.

References

External links 
 
 Biography at U.S. Court of Appeals for Veterans Claims

1972 births
Living people
20th-century American women lawyers
20th-century American lawyers
21st-century American women lawyers
21st-century American lawyers
21st-century American judges
21st-century American women judges
Judges of the United States Court of Appeals for Veterans Claims
United States Article I federal judges appointed by Donald Trump
United States Senate lawyers
University at Buffalo alumni
University at Buffalo Law School alumni